The New York City Human Rights Law (NYCHRL) is a civil rights law that is embodied in Title 8 of the Administrative Code of the City of New York.

It prohibits discrimination in employment, housing, and public accommodations based on race, color, creed, age, national origin, alienage or citizenship status, gender (including gender identity and sexual harassment), sexual orientation, disability, marital status, and partnership status.

The law requires employers to make reasonable accommodations for pregnant workers, and provides protection against discrimination in employment based on unemployment status, arrest or conviction record, and status as a victim of domestic violence, stalking, and sex offenses. In housing, it provides other protections based on lawful occupation, family status, and any lawful source of income. It also prohibits retaliation, bias-related harassment, (including cyberbullying), bias-related profiling by law enforcement, and discrimination against interns.

Eight commissioners on the city’s Commission on Human Rights enforce New York City’s Human Rights Law.

See also
 New York Human Rights Law

References

External links
 Text of New York City Human Rights Law

Human rights in the United States
New York (state) statutes
Anti-discrimination law in the United States
Government of New York City
New York City law